The Amma Makkal Munnettra Kazagam (AMMK) is an Indian regional political party in the state of Tamil Nadu. It is a Dravidian party founded by the former member of parliament of the Republic of India T. T. V. Dhinakaran at Madurai on 15 March 2018 as a breakaway faction from the All India Anna Dravida Munnetra Kazhagam after his expulsion and that of his aunt V. K. Sasikala. The headquarters of the party is located at Westcott Salai, Royapettah, Chennai.

History

RK Nagar by-election 
In December 2017, Dinakaran contested in RK Nagar by-election and won by a huge margin of 40,707 votes. He became the first independent candidate to win a bypoll in Tamil Nadu and this was the first time in 18 years that a ruling party in the state lost a by-election.

Formation 

On 15 March 2018 at a public meeting in Madurai, TTV Dinakaran launched the party flag and named the party "Amma Makkal Munnettra Kazhagam" after the AIADMK expelled him as well as his aunt V. K. Sasikala. Sasikala and Dhinakaran were assigned the post of general secretary and deputy general secretary of the party respectively. Dhinakaran was also elected as national convener by his party members. 

In February 2019, actor Ranjith resigned as the Tamil Nadu state vice-president post in the PMK and joined AMMK to register his protest against the PMK's decision to join an alliance led by the AIADMK. On 19 April, Dhinakaran was elected as the general secretary and stated that Sasikala would be appointed as the party president after her release from jail. The Election Commission of India recognized the AMMK as a registered state party in December 2019, while the post of the party president remained vacant.

Elections and alliances

Before the 2019 general elections in Tamil Nadu,  the AMMK entered into a political alliance with the Social Democratic Party of India (SDPI) in March 2019, allotting one seat to it. The AMMK was allocated the gift box symbol for the election. Both the parties failed to win from any of the seats, though the AMMK was able to spilt the votes the AIADMK would have usually received. During the rural local body elections held later in the same year, the AMMK had to contest on another symbol, this time of the coconut tree, and was able to secure victory from 94 panchayat union wards.

Ahead of the 2021 legislative assembly elections in Tamil Nadu and Puducherry, the Election Commission allotted the pressure cooker symbol to AMMK in December 2020. In Tamil Nadu, the AMMK entered into an alliance called the "People's Front" with Desiya Murpokku Dravida Kazhagam (DMDK), All India Majlis-e-Ittehadul Muslimeen (AIMIM), SDPI and other smaller parties for the election. Out of 234 seats, 60 seats were allocated to DMDK, six to SDPI and three to AIMIM. One seat each was allotted to Makkalarasu Katchi, Viduthalai Tamil Puligal Katchi, Gokula Makkal Katchi and Marudhu Senai Sangam. Candidates from these parties contested under AMMK. In Puducherry, it allied with SDPI and allotted it four seats.

Sasikala however announced her retirement from politics in March 2021, a month after being released from jail, and did not support the AMMK when it decided to contest against the AIADMK in the elections. While the AMMK and DMDK failed to win any seats in Tamil Nadu, the two cut into the vote share of AIADMK in 21 seats. The AIMIM and SDPI failed to win any seats as well and had a dismal performance.

The AMMK was again allotted the pressure cooker symbol for the 2022 Tamil Nadu urban local body elections. It won from three corporation wards, 33 municipal wards and 66 town panchayat wards. After his expulsion from the AIADMK in July 2022 and restoration in August amidst a power struggle with Edappadi K. Palaniswami, AIADMK leader O. Panneerselvam expressed the desire to unify the party along with Sasikala and Dhinakaran. Dhinakaran rejected the idea of merging the AMMK with AIADMK, but stated that his party was willing to ally with them.

Party flag 
The flag is black at the top and red at the bottom with white in the middle with the smiling image of former Chief Minister of Tamil Nadu J. Jayalalithaa in the middle.

Electoral performance

Indian general elections

Legislative Assembly elections

References 

Amma Makkal Munnetra Kazhagam
State political parties in Tamil Nadu
State political parties in Puducherry
Political parties established in 2018
Jayalalithaa
2018 establishments in Tamil Nadu